Head light may refer to:
 Head Light, 1996 album by Trance Mission
 Headlight, a lamp attached to the front of a vehicle